Himmatwala in Hindi-Urdu means "courageous". It may refer to:
Himmatwala (1983 film), a 1983 Bollywood action-drama film starring Jeetendra and Sridevi directed by K. Raghavendra Rao 
Himmatwala (1998 film), a 1998 Hindi-language Indian film starring Mithun Chakraborty and Ayesha Jhulka in lead roles and directed by Jayant Gilatar
Himmatwala (2013 film), a Bollywood action comedy film directed by Sajid Khan, featuring Ajay Devgn opposite Tamannaah in the lead roles